Russell Wolfe (c. 1965 – May 27, 2015) was an American actor and film producer who co-founded the Christian film production company, Pure Flix Entertainment with David A. R. White.

Personal life
Wolfe was married to Alysoun Wolfe and they had two children.  On December 2013, Wolfe was diagnosed with ALS.

Death
On May 27, 2015, Wolfe died of ALS at the age of 50 in Scottsdale, Arizona.

Select filmography

Actor
The Wager (2007)
Sarah's Choice (2009)
In the Blink of an Eye (2009; also screenwriter)
What If... (2010)
Holyman Undercover (2010)
Apostle Peter and the Last Supper (2012)
The Book of Esther (2013)
The Book of Daniel (2013)
God's Not Dead (2014)

Producer
The Wager (2007)
Sarah's Choice (2009)
In the Blink of an Eye (2009)
What If... (2010)
The Encounter (2011)
Apostle Peter and the Last Supper (2012)
The Mark (2012)
The Book of Esther (2013)
The Book of Daniel (2013)
God's Not Dead (2014)
Moms' Night Out (2014)
Do You Believe? (2015)
Dancer and the Dame (2015)
God's Not Dead 2 (2016)

References

External links

1960s births
2015 deaths
21st-century American male actors
American film producers
Neurological disease deaths in Arizona
Deaths from motor neuron disease